Comitas peelae is a species of sea snail, a marine gastropod mollusk in the family Pseudomelatomidae, the turrids and allies.

Description
The length of the shell varies between 50 mm and 105 mm.

Distribution
This marine species occurs off Réunion and the Philippines.

References

 * L. Bozzetti, Description of a new species of the genus Comitas Finlay, 1926 from the Philippines and Reunion (Gastropoda, Turridae); Bull. Inst. Malac. Tokyo 3 (1): 1-3 (1993)

External links
 
 

peelae
Gastropods described in 1993